The Triple Crown of Harness Racing for Pacers consists of these horse races:

Cane Pace, held at the Meadowlands Racetrack in East Rutherford, New Jersey
Messenger Stakes, held at Yonkers Raceway in Yonkers, New York
Little Brown Jug, held at the Delaware County Fair in Delaware, Ohio

Since its inauguration in 1956, the Pacing Triple Crown has had 10 winners:

External links
New Jersey Horse Enthusiast Web
The Harness Triple Crown Trophies for both Pacing and Trotting

Harness racing in the United States
Racing series for horses